Madagasikara madagascarensis s a species of tropical freshwater snail with a gill and an operculum, an aquatic gastropod mollusc in the family Pachychilidae.

This species is endemic to Madagascar.

Description

References

Pachychilidae
Gastropods described in 1840
Taxonomy articles created by Polbot
Endemic fauna of Madagascar